Fritz Lobinger (born 22 January 1929) is a German prelate of the Catholic Church who spent his career as a missionary in South Africa where, as head of the Lumko Missiological Institute, he developed the concepts of small Christian communities and Bible sharing. He was Bishop of Aliwal from 1987 to 2004. He has advocated the ordination of teams of married men as priests to serve communities that otherwise lack regular access to the sacraments, with their functions designed to distinguish them from celibate priests.

Biography
Fritz Lobinger was born on 22 January 1929 in Passau He  was ordained as a priest in Regensburg on June 29, 1955. He arrived in Aliwal, South Africa, in 1956. Oswald Hirmer followed in 1957 and Hubert Bucher in 1958. All three of them would spend the rest of their lives in South Africa and become bishops.

Lobinger launched his extensive writing career in 1963, publishing with Hirmer as co-author Africa’s Way to Life, a catechism based on their experience of African culture and designed for the instruction of adult candidates for baptism. The two colleagues were also the first missionaries in more than a century to encourage the use of traditional Xhosa musical styles in creating church songs.

From 1970 to 1986, Lobinger worked at the Lumko Missiological Institute, the Pastoral Institute of the Episcopal Conference for the implementation of Second Vatican Council in South Africa. Lobinger’s early interest was in developing a system of "trainer catechists" to develop lay leadership, recognizing that a catechist plays a far greater role in the local community than his title suggests. He found models of lay engagement in Anglican and Methodist parishes. He visited Brazil several times to study the work of education theorist Paolo Freire. He produced training materials and lead training sessions throughout South Africa.

He completed his doctorate in theology in 1986. On 18 November 1987, Pope John Paul II appointed him Bishop of the Diocese of Aliwal. He received his episcopal consecration on 27 February 1987 from Wilfrid Fox Napier, Archbishop of Durban.

John Paul accepted his resignation for reasons of age on 29 April 2004. In retirement Lobinger lived with Hubert Bucher and Oswald Hirmer, until their deaths in 2008 and 2011 respectively, in a nursing home for priests in Mariannhill, a suburb of Durban, the headquarters of the Congregation of Mariannhill Missionaries.

Pastoral theory
Working as missionaries, Lobinger and his colleagues at Lumko became advocates of inculturation to promote evangelization in a non-European context. They experimented with and documented ways of engaging parishioners in Church life. Confronted with the shortage of priests, Lobinger has advocated the creation of a new type of Catholic priesthood. He does not advocate the ordination of married men as peers of celibate priests. Instead he argues for the ordination of groups of married men, respected community elders, playing no role outside their local community. He also believes that the presence of these teams of married elders would enhance the laity's image of the celibate priesthood.

Speaking with reporters in January 2019, Pope Francis provided an outline of Lobinger's views as presented in his book Priests for Tomorrow. He called Lobinger's proposals "interesting" and "a matter for discussion among theologians", while repeating his own insistence on maintaining celibacy as general practice while considering the ordination of married men to serve linguistic minorities and geographically remote communities. Francis also interpreted Lobinger to mean that the elders would enjoy only one of the three gifts conferred by ordination, leading prayer and celebrating the sacraments, but without the other ministries of teaching and governing. Lobinger objected that this interpretation diminishes the role of the elders in a way he did not intend, but allowed that "this is a time of moving into new territory and one must find a way".

Writings 
  (Dissertation at the University of Münster Faculty of Catholic Theology, 1971)
 With Adolf Exeler und Heinrich Aertker: 
 
 
 
 
 With Paul M. Zulehner: 
 With Paul M. Zulehner und Peter Neuner:

Notes

References

Further reading

External links

 Catholic Hierarchy: Bishop Fritz Lobinger 
 Paul M. Zulehner, Priester für Morgen (Priests for Tomorrow)
 Bischof Fritz Lobinger, Mitbegründer des LUMKO-Institut

20th-century Roman Catholic bishops in South Africa
21st-century Roman Catholic bishops in South Africa
Roman Catholic missionaries in South Africa
German Roman Catholic missionaries
Clerical celibacy
People from Passau
1929 births
Living people
Roman Catholic bishops of Aliwal